Blind Pig Who Wants to Fly is a 2008 Indonesian drama film written, directed, and produced by Edwin. Starring fellow filmmaker Joko Anwar and Ladya Cheryl, it is Edwin's feature film debut after a string of critically acclaimed short films.

Renowned filmmakers Mira Lesmana and Riri Riza are credited as associate producers of the film alongside Kemal Arsjad.

Synopsis 
The experiences of a woman and the people around her, all with obsessive agendas of their own. A fragile but panoramic vision of a community that is not at ease with itself—and hopes that can never be truly fulfilled.

Cast 
 Joko Anwar as Yahya
 Ladya Cheryl as Linda
Clairine Baharrizki as young Linda
 Andhara Early as Salma
 Carlo Genta as Cahyono
 Pong Harjatmo as Halim
 Wicaksono as Helmi

Release 
The film was released domestically in Indonesia on 3 October 2008 and on 11 September 2009 in the United States. It had a successful festival run, winning awards at the Golden Horse Film Festival in Taiwan, the Three Continents Festival in France, the International Film Festival Rotterdam in the Netherlands, and the Singapore International Film Festival in Singapore.

Reception

Box office 
Despite positive critical response and multiple festival wins, he film did not perform well at the box office, only grossing $344 during its limited run.

Critical response 
Writing for The New York Times, critic Mike Hale described the film as "a series of vignettes, practically blackouts, that jump back and forth in time", praising the direction and performances as well as depictions of gay characters, calling the sex scene "discreetly filmed but more matter of fact  and funnier than anything in Hollywood’s recent spate of bromances". Hale went on to compare Edwin favorably to Thai film auteur Pen-ek Ratanaruang.

Awards and nominations

References

External links

2008 films
Indonesian drama films
2000s Indonesian-language films
Indonesian LGBT-related films
Gay-related films
2008 LGBT-related films
2008 directorial debut films
LGBT-related drama films